Maytenus matudae is a species of plant in the family Celastraceae. It is endemic to Mexico.

References

matudae
Endemic flora of Mexico
Trees of Chiapas
Trees of Guerrero
Taxonomy articles created by Polbot
Taxobox binomials not recognized by IUCN